The class YDM-4 is Indian Railways' workhorse diesel locomotive. The first units were imported fully built from the American Locomotive Company (Alco) in 1961. Since 1968, it has been manufactured in India by the Banaras Locomotive Works (BLW), Varanasi. The model name stands for metre gauge (Y), diesel (D), mixed traffic (M) engine. The YDM-4 has been the most successful diesel locomotive in the metre gauge operation of Indian Railways.
The YDM-4A is a variant of the YDM-4 supplied by MLW . Originally equipped with vacuum brakes. Some were later equipped with dual brakes, particularly those working in the Northeast Frontier Railway were retrofitted with dual brake system by Lumding shed.

History
In the mid 1950s Indian Railways began introducing diesel locomotives to its metre gauge system. Metre gauge, though rare gauge today, used to be a dominant gauge that time. After the introduction of YDM-1 locomotives by North British, Indian Railway thought for more powerful ones and hence General Motors Electro-Motive Division (EMD) and the American Locomotive Company (ALCO) submitted designs of YDM-3/YDM-5 (12-567C) and YDM-4 respectively for new diesel locomotives. Each company supplied 30 locomotives in 1961. While YDM-3 was 13 ton lighter than the YDM-4, Indian Railways opted for the ALCo design because of the heavier axle load and technology agreement that would allow these locomotives to be manufactured in India. After Banaras Locomotive Works (BLW) completed construction of its factory in Varanasi, production of the locomotives began in India. Initial 30 YDM-4 locomotives supplied by American Locomotive Company (ALCo) in 1961 had the road numbers in #6020 to #6049 range. Another batch of 8 locomotives followed the route to India soon which had the road numbers in #6105-6112 range. YDM-4 #6113-6129 were built perhaps in 1964.
Siliguri Diesel Locoshed was the first DLS to home YDM-4 locomotives in 1962. The very first YDM4 numbered as #6020 was allotted to New Guwahati Diesel Loco Shed which was an outbase of Siliguri DLS on 30/10/1962. The loco, however is assumed to be scrapped due to overage.

YDM4 numbered in #6130 to #6198 range were built by Montreal Locomotive Works (MLW) in 1964 under the license of ALCo and were classified as YDM-4A. All the YDM-4 delivered till then were presumably based at three premier DLS across India namely Siliguri (SGUJ), Ponmalai Goldenrock (GOC) and Sabarmati (SBI).

The First YDM-4 built by Banaras Locomotive Works (BLW) Varanasi was #6199 named as Hubli. This loco rolled out from DLW in 1968 and was dedicated to the nation by the then Deputy Prime Minister of India, Morarji Desai. DLW built at first locos in the range #6199 to #6258.

Another batch of YDM-4A were dispatched from MLW in 1969 in the range #6259 to #6288.

From 1969 till 1993 DLW produced YDM-4 locomotives for Indian Railways in the number range #6289 to #6769. Last YDM-4 was based at Rangapara North outbase of Siliguri DLS but later on transferred to Myanmar (Burma) Railways and possibly renumbered as DF1332.

Locomotive sheds

Technical specifications

References

External links
 YDM-4 Diesel Locomotive Internals

M, Y-4
Co-Co locomotives
ALCO locomotives
Railway locomotives introduced in 1961
Metre gauge locomotives